Albisola Superiore is a comune (municipality) in the Province of Savona in the Italian region Liguria, located about  southwest of Genoa and about  northeast of Savona.

Main sights
Medieval castle
Sanctuary of Madonna della Pace (Madonna of the Peace), on the road towards Stella.
Villa Gavotti.

People
 Giuliano della Rovere, Pope Julius II
 Juan Bautista Chapa (Giovanni Bautista Schiapapria)
 Giampaolo Parini (artist)
 Davide Biale, bassist

References

External links

 Official website 

Cities and towns in Liguria